Alif may refer to:

Languages
 Alif (ا) in the Arabic alphabet, equivalent to aleph, the first letter of many Semitic alphabets
 Dagger alif, superscript alif in Arabic alphabet
 Alif, the first letter of the Urdu alphabet
 Alif, the eighth consonant of the Thaana abugida used in Dhivehi

Films and TV
 Alif (2015 film), an Indian Malayalam film
 Alif (2016 film), an Indian Hindi film produced by Pawan Tiwari and Zaigham Imam 
 Alif (TV series), a Pakistani drama produced by Samina Humayun Saeed

Places
 Ari Atoll or Alif, a historic administrative division of the Maldives
 Alif, Iran, a village in Fars Province, Iran

Other uses
 Alif (rapper) (born 1989), singer,  lyricist,  composer and  recording publisher
 Anterior Lumbar Interbody Fusion, a type of spinal fusion
 ALIF (Liberate Attack of the Feminist Infantry), female hip hop group from Senegal